Khökh Serkh (blue buck) with a latitude of 48.05 (48° 3' 2 N) and a longitude of 90.87 (90° 51' 59 E), is a mountain located in west Mongolia. The highest peak is the Takhilt.

See also 
 List of mountains in Mongolia

References 

Altai Mountains
Mountains of Mongolia